Bathyptychia is a genus of medium-sized air-breathing land snails, terrestrial pulmonate gastropod mollusks in the family Clausiliidae, the door snails, all of which have a clausilium.

Species
Species within the genus Bathyptychia include: 
 Bathyptychia aplostoma (Heude, 1885)
 Bathyptychia beresowskii (Möllendorff, 1902)
 Bathyptychia breviplica (Möllendorff, 1886)
 Bathyptychia bulimina (Gredler, 1892)
 Bathyptychia hupeana (Gredler, 1892)
 Bathyptychia hupecola (Gredler, 1888)
 Bathyptychia infantilis (Gredler, 1890)
 Bathyptychia martensi H. Nordsieck, 2001
 Bathyptychia mira H. Nordsieck, 2003
 Bathyptychia ookuboi Hunyadi & Szekeres, 2016
 Bathyptychia provisoria (Gredler, 1888)
 Bathyptychia recens (Gredler, 1894)
 Bathyptychia septentrionalis H. Nordsieck, 2016
 Bathyptychia strictilabris (Schmacker & O. Boettger, 1890)

References

 Lindholm, W. A. (1925). A supplement to the revised systematic list of the genera of the Clausiliidae. Proceedings of the Malacological Society of London. 16 (6): 261-266. London
 Lindholm, W. A. (1925). A supplement to the revised systematic list of the genera of the Clausiliidae. Proceedings of the Malacological Society of London. 16 (6): 261-266. London
 Bank, R. A. (2017). Classification of the Recent terrestrial Gastropoda of the World. Last update: July 16th, 2017

Clausiliidae